Reincarnationism or biblical reincarnation is the belief that certain people are or can be reincarnations of biblical figures, such as Jesus Christ and the Virgin Mary.

Christianity

Some Christians believe that certain New Testament figures are reincarnations of Old Testament figures. For example, John the Baptist is believed by some to be a reincarnation of the prophet Elijah.

Other Christians believe the Second Coming of Jesus was fulfilled by reincarnation. Sun Myung Moon, the founder of the Unification Church, considered himself to be the fulfillment of Jesus' return.

Catholicism

The Catholic Church does not believe in reincarnation, which it regards as being incompatible with death. Nonetheless, the leaders of certain sects in the church have taught that they are reincarnations of Mary - for example, Marie-Paule Giguère of the Army of Mary and Maria Franciszka of the former Mariavites.

The Congregation for the Doctrine of the Faith excommunicated the Army of Mary for teaching heresy, including reincarnationism.

See also

 List of people claimed to be Jesus
 List of heresies in Catholicism

References

Reincarnation